Irma Kurti  (born March 20, 1966 in Tirana) is a well-known Albanian poet, writer, lyricist, journalist and translator. She is a naturalized Italian citizen.

Life 
She graduated from the English Department of the University of Tirana in 1988, and has since worked as a teacher of English and journalist for various newspapers, such as “Mësuesi” (The teacher), and “Dita informacion” (The Day Information), among others.

In September 1997, she completed a one-year Greek language and culture course at the University of Athens, Greece. She also took numerous courses for specialization in journalism in various locations across Europe and North America.

Kurti began writing poetry at an early age. In 1980, she won first prize in a national contest as part of “Pionieri” magazine's 35th anniversary. In 1989, she took second prize in a competition organized by Radio-Tirana for young poets on the 45th anniversary of Albania's liberation. Since then, she has won 30 awards in several international literary contests within Italy and Switzerland. In 2013, she won the IX Edition International Prize Universum Donna (equivalent to Woman of the Year) and the Ambassador of Peace nomination from the University of Peace in Lugano, Switzerland. She was also awarded "The Albanian Poet of the year 2015” prize from the Albanian P.E.N. Center.

Irma Kurti is also well known as the lyrics writer of many famous Albanian songs.

The poems of Irma Kurti have been included in some publications of the International Library of Poetry in Maryland, USA as in the Anthology: “Forever Spoken”, "The best poems and poets of 2007" etc. Her poems and short stories have been included in the anthologies: “Il Federiciano”, publication of the Publishing House "Aletti Editore" 2010, "Diffusione Autori" 2011, of "GDS Edizioni", "Lingua Madre- Stories of foreign women in Italy, 2012/2013", “The Universal Encyclopedia of Italian Authors 2013” etc.

She has published twenty-six books in Albanian and twenty in Italian including poetry collections, short stories, and novels. Several of her books have also been translated into other languages.

In the year 2020 she received the title of Honorary President of WikiPoesia.
She lives in Bergamo, Italy.

Books published in Albanian by Irma Kurti 

 Këtë natë me ty, poetries, 1999;
 Shihemi në një tjetër botë, poetries, 2002;
 Qirinjtë janë fikur, poetries, 2003;
 Bëj sikur fle, poetries, 2005;
 Puthja e fundit, poetries, 2007;
 Midis dy brigjeve, autobiographical novel, 2010;
 Një vjeshtë pa kthim, short stories, 2013;
 Nën bluzën time, poetries, 2013. 
 Copëza shënimesh nëpër rrugët e shkreta, journalism articles, 2013;
 Njeriu që fliste me pemët, novel, 2015;
 Nuk është ky deti, poetries, 2016;
 Lajmet vijnë edhe këtu, short stories, 2016;
 Krahët rreh një flutur, poems for children, 2016;
 Në pragun e një dhimbjeje, poetries, 2016;
 Pa atdhe, poetries, 2017;
 Në borxh me dashurinë, poetries, 2018;
 Mesazhe nga lart, poetries, 2018;
 Kohë për t’u dashur, poetries, 2019;
 Dallgët thërresin emrin tënd, novel, 2020;
 Zëri yt tretet në erë, poetries, 2020;
 Grimca gëzimi, poetries, 2020;
 Kujtimet e një mjeku, coauthor Hasan Kurti, 2021;
 Shelgu lotues, poetries, 2021;
 Humbur mes ngjyrash, poetries, 2022;
 Ti je loti im, poetries, 2022;
 Ditët e fundit të një qyteti, novel, 2022.

Books in Italian 

 Tra le due rive, novel, 2011;
 Risvegliare un amore spento, poetries, 2011;
 Un autunno senza ritorno, short stories, 2012;
 Sotto la mia maglia, poetries, 2013;
 Le notizie arrivano anche qui, short stories, 2014;
 Non è questo il mare, poetries, 2014;
 Sulla soglia di un dolore, poetries, 2016;
 Senza patria, poetries, 2016;
 In assenza di parole, novel, 2017;
 Le pantofole della solitudine, poetries, 2018;
 Il sole ha emigrato, poetries, 2019;
 In una stanza con i ricordi, poetries, 2019;
 Nella mia anima piove, poetries, 2020;
 I ricordi di un medico, memories, coauthor Hasan Kurti, 2020;
 Messaggi dall'alto, poetries, 2021;
 Briciole di gioia, poetries, 2021;
 Le onde chiamano il tuo nome, novel, 2021;
 Un immenso cielo d’estate, poetries, 2022;
 Persi tra i colori, poetries, 2022;
 Un giorno mi racconterai, poetries, 2022.

 Books in English 

 I knew the gray sky, poetries, 2014. 
 Under my blouse, poetries, 2015. 
 A cottage in the forest, children's poetry, 2016.
 Without a homeland, poetries, USA, 2019.
 Within a sorrow, poetries, Philippines, 2021.
 In every raindrop, poetries, 2021.
 Love, you don't know, poetries, Canada, 2022.
 The last days of a city, novel, Philippines, 2022.
 Vanished loves, poetries, India, 2022.
 It’s ranining in my soul, bilingual English-Turkish, Turkey 2022.
 Your image between my fingers, bilingual English-Spanish, Chile 2023.
 One day you will tell me'', poetries, USA, 2023.

Awards 

 Third prize at the International Contest of Poetry and Prose 2010 of the “Napoli Cultural Classic” Association, Italy, in the category of the foreign authors.  
 Special prize at the International Contest of Poetry and Prose 2011 "Coluccio Salutati", Borgo a Buggiano, Pistoia for the poetry: “And I come back”.
 First prize at the International Contest of Poetry and Prose 2011 “Napoli Cultural Classic” in the category of the foreign authors for the poetry: “Under my blouse”.  
 First prize in the section of prose of the International Contest “Lake Gerundo -Europe and Culture”, ninth edition, 2011, at the city of Paullo, Milano, for the book “Between the two coasts”.
 Honorable Mention at the International Contest “Lands of Liguria 2011”, La Spezia with the book "Between two coasts”.
 Critics prize at the International Contest of Poetry and Prose “The cultural integration for a better world”, Milano for the book of poetries: "To awaken a forgotten love".
 Special Prize, International University of Peace at the XIII Edition 2012 of the International Literary Contest "Europe", at Lugano, Switzerland for the book: “Between the two coasts”.
 Third prize at the International Literary Contest of Poetry and Prose 2012, City of  Recco, Genoa, for the book: "To awaken a forgotten love”.
Second prize at the 26° International Literary Contest “Giovani Gronchi” in Pontedera, Pisa for the book: “An autumn with no return”.
 Third prize at the International Literary Contest: “Europa” 2013, at Lugano, Switzerland for the book: “An autumn with no return”.
 The International Prize “Universum Donna” for the Literature, IX Edition 2013  and the “Ambassador of Peace” nomination from the University of Peace of Lugano, Switzerland. 
 Third prize at the fourth edition of the Literary Contest Valle Vigezzo “Andrea Testore“  for the story: “The secret of a spring day”.
 Third prize at “Giovanni Gronchi 2013” Literary Contest  in Pontedera (Pisa) for the book: “Between the two coasts”.
 Special Prize at the International Literary Contest: "Città di Pontremoli" 2014, for the book: "An autumn with no return".
 First Prize at the International Literary Contest: "Città di Treviglio”  for short stories.
 Third Prize at the International Literary Contest: "“Antico Borgo” 2014, La Spezia for the book: "Under my blouse".
 Honorable Mention at the Literary Contest: "Editorial Initiative 2014", Bergamo.
 First Prize at the International Literary Contest: “Europa” 2015, Lugano, Switzerland, for the poetry book: “Under my blouse”.
 Second Prize at the International Literary Contest: “Città di Pontremoli” 2015, for the poetry book: “This is not the sea”.
 Third Prize at the National Literary Contest: “Salvatore Quasimodo”  Palazzago, Bergamo.
 First Prize at the International Literary Contest: “Posedonia Paestum” 2015, Salerno, in the category of the foreign authors.
 Honorable Mention at the International Literary Contest: “Together in the world” 2015, Savona, with the book: “The news arrive even here”.
 "The Albanian Poetess of the year 2015” from the Albanian P.E.N Center.
 Honorable mention at the International Literary Contest of poetry and prose “Napoli Cultural Classic 2016” in the category of the foreign authors. 
 Special Prize “The poetry of people” at the International Literary Contest:”Youth Center and poetry Triuggio”.
 The best song lyrics at Children Festival “Vihuela 2016”, in Pristine, Kosovo.
 The second prize at the Literary Contest:”The poetic spring of Diaspora 2016” in Zurich, organized by the Association  of the Albanian Writers in Switzerland and the Cultural Center of Kosovo. 
 Honorable Mention at the Literary Contest "Filippo Maria Tripolone" XV Edition, for the book: “Between the two costs”
 "The best book" prize for the poetry book: "On the threshold of a pain" at the International Literary Contest: "Poem Academy Awards" organised by the Academy of Artists in Napoli.
 The second prize at the International Literary Contest "Leandro Polverini" for the poetry book: "This is not the sea".

References

External links 

 http://www.comune.rozzano.mi.it/index.php/archivio-news/421-maggio-2013/1638-incontro-con-la-poesia-di-irma-kurti.html 
 http://www.albanianews.it/notizie/flashnews/irma-kurti
 http://www.qlibri.it/poesia/poesia-italiana/sotto-la-mia-maglia/ 
https://web.archive.org/web/20120328035129/http://www.marta-ajo.it/vis_dettaglio.php?id_livello=3335
http://www.paroleinfuga.it/display-text.asp?IDopera=43110
http://www.forumishqiptar.com/showthread.php?t=51735
http://www.reportonline.it/2011040244796/cultura/pubblicato-il-libro-tra-le-due-rive-un-coinvolgente-romanzo-di-kurti-irma.html
http://www.lakinzica.it/eventi-pisa-incroci-di-civilta-incontri-con-scrittori-stranieri-pontedera
http://www.albanianews.it/notizie/flashnews/irma-kurti
http://www.panorama.com.al/irma-kurti-nje-roman-per-emigracionin/
https://archive.today/20151126073744/http://topbusinessmagazine.com/le-notizie-arrivano-anche-qui-di-irma-kurti/
http://www.panorama.com.al/cmimi-irma-kurti-universum-donna/
http://www.rtklive.com/?id=10&r=33499
https://web.archive.org/web/20160304071125/http://pegasiworld-al.com/irma-kurti/

Albanian women poets
Italian poets
Italian writers
People from Tirana
1966 births
Living people
21st-century Albanian poets
20th-century Albanian poets
20th-century Albanian women writers
21st-century Albanian women writers
Albanian journalists
Albanian women journalists
Albanian songwriters
Albanian translators
Albanian-language writers
Albanian-language poets
Albanian novelists
Albanian emigrants to Italy